Slapy is a municipality and village in Prague-West District in the Central Bohemian Region of the Czech Republic. It has about 900 inhabitants. It is located on the shore of Slapy Reservoir, which is the 6th largest dam in the country by area.

References

Villages in Prague-West District